Perm Krai (Perm Region) is a federal subject of Russia (a krai), located in Eastern Europe. Its administrative center is Perm. The population of the krai was 2,635,276 (2010 Census).

The krai was formed on December 1, 2005 as a result of the 2004 referendum on the merger of Perm Oblast and Komi-Permyak Autonomous Okrug. Komi-Permyak Okrug retained its autonomous status within Perm Krai during the transitional period of 2006–2008. It also retained a budget separate from that of the krai, keeping all federal transfers. Starting in 2009, Komi-Permyak Okrug's budget became subject to the budgeting law of Perm Krai. The transitional period was implemented in part because Komi-Permyak Okrug relies heavily on federal subsidies, and an abrupt cut would have been detrimental to its economy.

Geography
Perm Krai is located in the east of the East European Plain and the western slope of the Middle Ural Mountains. 99.8% of its area is in Europe, 0.2% in Asia.
length from north to south – 
length from west to east – 

The krai borders the Komi Republic in the north, Kirov Oblast in the northwest, the Udmurt Republic in the southwest, the Republic of Bashkortostan in the south, and Sverdlovsk Oblast in the east.

Rivers

Rivers of Perm Krai belong to the Kama River Basin, the largest tributary of Volga River. There are more than 29,000 rivers in Perm Krai.

Only two rivers in Perm Krai have lengths exceeding .

The longest of them are:
Sylva River — 493 km (306 mi)
Kolva River — 460 km (285 mi)
Vishera River — 415 km (258 mi)
Yayva River — 403 km (250 mi)
Kosva River — 283 km (176 mi)
Kosa River — 267 km (165 mi)
Veslyana River — 266 km (165 mi)
Inva River — 257 km (159 mi)
Obva River — 247 km (153 mi)

There are also many small rivers, but some of them have historical significance, for example Yegoshikha River, at the mouth of which the city of Perm was founded.

Climate
Perm Krai has a continental climate.

Minerals

Perm Krai has an abundance of minerals. Oil, natural gas, gold, diamonds, chromites, peat, limestone and building materials are among the many natural resources extracted.

Oil in its area was first discovered in 1929 near settlement Verhnechusovskie Gorodki. Currently there are more than 180 oil and gas fields known. Among them the developed ones are: 89 oil, 2 gas and 18 both oil and gas fields. Most of them are small and based in the central and southern districts of the krai. The northern fields are less developed because the oil lies deep under salt layers.

Coal has been mined in Perm Krai for more than 200 years. For a long time it played an important role in the fuel and energy balance in the region. Maximum mining was in 1960 when it reached 12 million tonnes. Mining then decreased and there are no exploration of new fields.

The Verkhnekamskoye deposit of potassium salts is one of the largest in the world. It is approx. , and the thickness of the salt layers reaches 514 m.

In 1841 the geological Permian Period was named after strata of rocks from that time were found in this area.

Flora and fauna
Forests cover about 71% of Perm Krai's area. Coniferous  forests predominate, with deciduous forests more common in the south.
There are 62 species of mammals, more than 270 species of birds, 39 species of fishes, 6 species of reptile and 9 species of amphibians.

Three nature reserves are located in Perm Krai: Basegi, Vishera, Preduralie.

Politics

During the Soviet period, the high authority in the oblast was shared between three persons: The first secretary of the Perm CPSU Committee (who in reality had the greatest authority), the chairman of the oblast Soviet (legislative power), and the Chairman of the oblast Executive Committee (executive power). Since 1991, CPSU lost all the power, and the head of the Oblast administration, and eventually the governor was appointed/elected alongside elected regional parliament.

The Charter of Perm Krai is the fundamental law of the region. The Legislative Assembly of Perm Krai is the province's standing legislative (representative) body. The Legislative Assembly exercises its authority by passing laws, resolutions, and other legal acts and by supervising the implementation and observance of the laws and other legal acts passed by it. The highest executive body is the Oblast Government, which includes territorial executive bodies such as district administrations, committees, and commissions that facilitate development and run the day to day matters of the province. The Oblast administration supports the activities of the Governor who is the highest official and acts as guarantor of the observance of the oblast Charter in accordance with the Constitution of Russia.

Law enforcement

The Directorate of the Ministry for Internal Affairs in Perm Krai (ГУ МВД России по Пермскому краю) or the Police of Perm (Полиция Перми) is the main law enforcement agency of the government of Perm Krai, Russia. It is answerable to the regional MVD and the governor of Perm Krai. The chief of police is Yuri Valyaev.

Administrative divisions

Administratively, the krai is divided into thirty-three districts, fourteen cities of krai significance, and one closed administrative-territorial formation. Six administrative districts are grouped into Komi-Permyak Okrug, which is an administrative unit with special status formed within Perm Krai as a result of the 2005 merger of Perm Oblast and Komi-Permyak Autonomous Okrug, both of which used to be the federal subjects.

Municipally, the territories of all administrative districts and those of nine cities of krai significance are incorporated as municipal districts. The remaining five cities are incorporated as urban okrugs.

Economy
Nonferrous metallurgy is based on ore processing Verkhnekamskoye potash deposit containing magnesium and rare metals. The factories are located in Berezniki (Titanium Magnesium Plant Corporation VSMPO) and Solikamsk (JSC Solikamsk magnesium plant).

In engineering plays an important role military production. The largest center of engineering is Perm; manufactured aircraft and rocket engines, oil field and mining equipment, Petrol motive-powered saws, communication equipment, vessels, cable and other products. The largest enterprises are Motovilikha Plants and Perm Motors. Timber Complex edge based on the use of the richest forest resources of Prikamye. Logging facilities are located mainly in the north of the region.

Demographics

According to the 2010 Census, the population of Perm Krai is 2,635,276; down from 2,819,421 recorded in the 2002 Census, and further down from 3,099,994 recorded in the 1989 Census.

Ethnic groups

Settlements

Vital Statistics for 2007: Source
Birth Rate: 12.05 per 1000
Death Rate: 15.70 per 1000
Net Immigration: -1.0 per 1000
NGR: -0.37% per Year
PGR: -0.48% per Year

Vital statistics for 2012
Births: 38 847 (14.8 per 1000)
Deaths: 37 278 (14.2 per 1000) 
Total fertility rate: 1.91

Death rates in some of the remote and rural areas in Perm Krai are very high, never seen before during times other than major wars or natural calamities. Just five districts out of a total of 47 have a surplus of births over death in Perm Krai. The birth rate in Perm Krai is much higher compared to other European regions. For example, the birth rate for Germany was 8.3 per 1000 in 2007. Perm as a whole is having 50% higher birth rate, and even the district with the lowest birth rate is having 20% higher BR compared to Germany. In 2008, the birth rate in Perm Krai was 8% higher than that of 2007. Close to 35.5 thousand births were recorded with the heaviest increases in City of Perm (+11%) and Komi-Permyak Autonomous Okrug (+18%). Among the districts, Kudymkar City recorded a 46% rise in birth rates for 2008 compared to 2007, while Usolsky recorded a 31% rise and Kyshertsky recorded a 29% rise. In 13 of the districts, there were more births than deaths, among them Ordynsky, Karagaysky, Kudimkar, Chernushynsky, Chaykovsky & Permsky.

Total fertility rate:
1995 - 1,31 | 2000 - 1,26 | 2005 - 1,34 | 2006 - 1,34 | 2007 - 1,47 | 2008 - 1,57 | 2009 - 1,61 | 2010 - 1,77 | 2011 - 1,78 | 2012 - 1,91 | 2013 - 1,93 | 2014 - 1,98 | 2015 - 2,02 | 2016 - 1,99(e)

Demographics for 2007

Religion

As of a 2012 survey 43% of the population of Perm Krai adheres to the Russian Orthodox Church, 5% declares to be generically unaffiliated Christian, 4% are Muslims, 2% are Rodnovers (Slavic folk religion), 1% are Old Believers, 1% Orthodox Christian believers who don't belong to churches or are members of non-Russian Orthodox churches, 8% follows other religion or did not give an answer to the survey. In addition, 24% of the population declares to be "spiritual but not religious" and 14% to be either atheist or not religious.

Major attractions

Perm Krai is home of several museums:
Perm State Art Gallery
Perm Museum of Local History
Museum of Motovilikha Plants
Architectural-Ethnographic Museum Khokhlovka and others.
Numerous architectural monuments are located in the small town of Usolye, in north of Perm Krai.  Particularly important are the Saviour Cathedral, with a separate bell tower, and House of Stroganov.

There are many theaters in Perm, including the Perm Opera and Ballet Theater, the Perm Academic Theater, the Puppet Theater, the Theater for Young Spectators, the Theater "Near Bridge", and others.

There are many temples and convents in Perm Krai. The most significant of them are: Belogorsky Convent located in 85 km from Perm, Sludskaya Church, Fedosievskaya Church, Perm Mosque and others.

Ordinsky is home to the Orda underwater caves. Located near Orda village in Perm region, Ural, Orda Cave is also the biggest underwater gypsum crystal cave in the world.

See also
 Klimova Treasure

References

Sources

External links

Official website of Perm Krai 
Perm Chamber of Commerce and Industry
Perm State University
Tourist Resources of Perm Krai
Official Website in Russian
Traffic police in Perm Krai

 
Krais of Russia
2005 establishments in Russia
States and territories established in 2005
Russian-speaking countries and territories